Events in the year 1951 in West Germany and East Germany.

Incumbents

West Germany
President –  Theodor Heuss
Chancellor –  Konrad Adenauer

East Germany
Head of State – Wilhelm Pieck
Head of Government – Otto Grotewohl

Events 
 April 29 - Rhineland-Palatinate state election, 1951
 June 5 - East German referendum, 1951
 June 6 to 17 - 1st Berlin International Film Festival

Births 
1 January - Hans-Joachim Stuck, racing driver
4 January - Richard Oetker, German businessman
8 January - Franz Pachl, German chess player and composer 
28 January - Karl Honz, German athlete
16 February - Franz-Josef Bode, German bishop of the Roman Catholic Diocese of Osnabrück
 4 March - Edelgard Bulmahn, German politician
 24 March - Monika Stolz, German politician
30 March - Wolfgang Niedecken, German singer
1 April - Johanna Wanka, German politician
9 April - Monika Piel, German journalist
17 April - Horst Hrubesch, German football player
26 June - Jürgen Rüttgers, German politician
28 June - Rolf Milser, German weightlifter
13 July - Sonia Seymour Mikich, German journalist
21 July - Eberhard Gienger, German politician and gymnast
26 July - Sabine Leutheusser-Schnarrenberger, German politician
31 July - Martin Mosebach, German writer
3 August - Hans Schlegel, German astronaut
5 August - Franz-Peter Hofmeister, German athlete
15 August - Herfried Münkler, German political scientist
5 September - Paul Breitner, German football player
22 September - Wolfgang Petry, German singer
24 September - Heinz Hoenig, German actor
29 September - Jörg Diesch, German sailor
29 September- Jutta Ditfurth, German sociologist, writer, and radical ecologist politician
5 October - Beate Heister, German businesswoman
20 October - Hans-Georg Aschenbach, German ski jumper
21 November - Thomas Roth, German journalist
2 December - Roman Bunka, German musician (died 2022)
4 December - Reinhard Eiben, German canoeist
14 December - Mike Krüger, German comedian
18 December - Volker Bouffier, German politician

Deaths
January 22 - Karl Nessler, German inventor of the permanent wave (born 1872)
January 30 - Ferdinand Porsche, German automobile pioneer (born 1875)
February 3 - August Horch German engineer and automobile pioneer,  (born 1868)
February 8 - Fritz Thyssen, German entrepreneur (born 1873)
March 12 - Alfred Hugenberg, German businessman, politician and publisher (born 1865)
April 26 - Gerda Müller, German actress (born 1894)
April 26 - Arnold Sommerfeld, German physicist (born 1868)
July 1 — Gustav Höhne, Wehrmacht general and Knight's Cross recipient (born 1893)
July 2 - Ferdinand Sauerbruch, German surgeon (born 1875)
July 20 - Wilhelm, German Crown Prince, German crown prince (born 1882)
August 4 - Ernst von Weizsäcker, German diplomat and politician (born 1882)
August 30 - Erich Emminger, German politician (born 1880)
October 6 - Otto Fritz Meyerhof, German physician and biochemist (born 1884)
October 17 - Johann Becker, German politician (born 1869)
October 20 - Karl Jarres, German politician (born 1874)
December 4 - Sebastian Finsterwalder, German mathematician and glaciologist (born 1862)

References

 
1950s in Germany
Years of the 20th century in Germany
Germany
Germany